Lieutenant-General Henry de Grangues (died June 1754) was a British Army officer.

He entered the Army in the reign of William III, two years before the peace of Ryswick. He served in the wars of Queen Anne, and was promoted to the lieutenant-colonelcy of the Royal Regiment of Dragoons. When the contest respecting the succession to the throne of Hungary and Bohemia involved Europe in another war, he was appointed colonel of a newly raised regiment which was numbered the 60th Foot, his commission bearing date the 21 January 1741. On 1 April 1743 he was removed to the 9th Dragoons, and on 1 November 1749 he obtained the colonelcy of the 4th Irish Horse (later 7th Dragoon Guards), which he retained until his death.

References
  page 85.

1754 deaths
British Army lieutenant generals
7th Dragoon Guards officers
1st The Royal Dragoons officers
9th Queen's Royal Lancers officers
30th Regiment of Foot officers
Year of birth unknown